Simon Lang is the pen name of science fiction writer, speaker, and grandmother Darlene Artell Hartman (born 1934).  Her principal works are the "Einai series".

Bibliography

Einai series

Analysis 

Reviewers spotted parallels between the "Einai" universe and the universe of Star Trek: The Original Series as soon as the first book in the series was published.  The Einai novels feature Captain Paul Riker, commander of the Galactic Federation starship USS Skipjack, and his half-human half-Einai telepathic Science Officer Dao Marik; which reviewers directly compared to Captain James T. Kirk, the United Federation of Planets starship USS Enterprise, and the Enterprise's half-human half-Vulcan telepathic Science Officer Spock.

The Clute+Nicholls Encyclopaedia of SF notes that the first two books of the series "suffer from their all too clear resemblance to Star Trek, for which Hartmann (sic) had written".  Zweig describes the series as "an object lesson in knowing when to stop writing", describing the first book as "very well written space opera that left me wishing for more" but the fourth book in the series as "probably one of the worst novels I've read in the past couple of years".

References

External links

American science fiction writers
1934 births
Living people